District 62 is a district of the Texas House of Representatives that serves all of Grayson, Franklin, Fannin, and Delta Counties. This district had its first representative in 1853. The current representative for District 62 is Republican Reggie Smith.

Representatives

References

062